The 1970 Florida Gators football team represented the University of Florida during the 1970 NCAA University Division football season. The season was Florida alumnus Doug Dickey's first of nine as the new head coach of the Florida Gators football team.  Dickey had been the starting quarterback for the Gators under coach Bob Woodruff in 1952 and 1953, and had previously served as the head coach of the Tennessee Volunteers before returning to his alma mater in 1970.  Dickey's 1970 Florida Gators finished with a 7–4 overall record and a 3–3 record in the Southeastern Conference (SEC), tying for third among ten SEC teams.

Schedule

Primary source: 2015 Florida Gators Football Media Guide

Attendance figures: 1971 University of Florida Brochure.

Roster

References

Florida
Florida Gators football seasons
Florida Gators football